Ferdinando Bernini (1 May 1910 – 1992) was an Italian sports shooter. He competed in the 25 m pistol event at the 1948 Summer Olympics.

References

1910 births
1992 deaths
Italian male sport shooters
Olympic shooters of Italy
Shooters at the 1948 Summer Olympics
Sportspeople from Parma